Guo Junchen (born 1 October 1997) is a singer and Chinese actor. He officially entered the entertainment industry in December 2015 when he played the eccentric Yang Yan in the Chinese web series "Go Princess Go". In 2018, Fiction co-starred with Amy Sun in the 2018 romcom "Accidentally in Love".

Education
Guo majored in performing arts at Beijing Film Academy.

Career
In 2015, Guo made his acting debut in the hit web series Go Princess Go. 
In 2016, he featured in the youth sports drama The Whirlwind Girl 2. 

In 2018, Guo played the main role in the romantic comedy web series Accidentally in Love. In 2019, Guo gained increased recognition for his role in the family drama Growing Pain.

Filmography

Television series

Variety show

Discography

Awards and nominations

References

External links 
 
 

1997 births
Living people
Male actors from Changchun
21st-century Chinese male actors
Chinese male television actors
Beijing Film Academy alumni